Aleksandar Savić (born Alel Schwarz; 19231941) was a Croatian communist activist and member of the partisan resistance movement in Croatia, murdered during the Holocaust in the Independent State of Croatia.

Savić was born in Zagreb to a Jewish family, the son of Miroslav Savić and Ina Juhn-Broda. His father changed the family surname from Schwarz to Savić due to the increasingly intense antisemitism in the 1930s.

Savić joined the Young Communist League of Yugoslavia - SKOJ (from Serbo-Croatian: Savez komunističke omladine Jugoslavije) during high school education. Savić was influenced by Beno Stein (a Croatian communist and medical internist, whose apartment was a favorite meeting place for leftist intellectuals) and his mother communist activities. Savić attended the gymnasium in Zagreb, where he led the SKOJ activities and was member of the SKOJ high school leadership in Zagreb.

Savić gathered the SKOJ advanced youth and held illegal meetings in his apartment. With the establishment of the Independent State of Croatia in 1941, he joined the resistance movement in Croatia. He participated in the writing of anti-fascist slogans and distribution of leaflets. On 24–25 May 1941, he was arrested with the group of 165 young Jewish men. He was deported to the Danica concentration camp near Koprivnica. Later he was deported to the Jadovno concentration camp where he was killed by Ustaše in July 1941; he was 17 or 18 years old.

References

Bibliography

 

 

1923 births
1941 deaths
Politicians from Zagreb
Croatian Jews who died in the Holocaust
Croatian communists
People who died in Jadovno concentration camp
Croatian civilians killed in World War II
Croatian people of World War II
Croatian people executed in Nazi concentration camps
Jewish socialists
Jewish resistance members during the Holocaust